You're My Lover Now is the third album by the Teeth, released on May 29, 2007. The Teeth's bassist and songwriter Peter MoDavis said of the album, "Emotionally, it is a painfully absurd vision of the mundane intertwined with inspiring buildups and pathetic letdowns." Cristina Black of Time Out New York stated that the album is "more serious" than its predecessor Carry the Wood, "without sacrificing the quirks that save their music from the pitfalls of earnest retro-pop."

Track listing

References

2007 albums